Hup is the second album by The Wonder Stuff, released in 1989.

Song information
"Piece of Sky" was originally planned to be the next single after "Golden Green", but this plan was abandoned when Rob Jones left the band in December 1989. The promotional video originally filmed for "Piece Of Sky" was re-worked (notably with all shots of Rob Jones being removed) and ultimately used for their next single, "Circlesquare", which was written on the same day as "Can't Shape Up"; May 9, 1989.

"Can't Shape Up" was originally much slower and played on acoustic guitar with harmonica. One version featured references to Rick Astley. The slower version was released on the Welcome to the Cheap Seats EP.

"Unfaithful" is the folksy ballad on the album, and does not feature percussion, only strings and acoustic guitar. "Golden Green" was originally a purely electric guitar and percussion song which had Martin Bell's fiddle and banjo added. There was an alternate chorus to "Golden Green" which was not included in the version on Hup.

Track listing

All songs written and performed by The Wonder Stuff except where noted

 "30 Years in the Bathroom"
 "Radio Ass Kiss"
 "Golden Green"
 "Let's Be Other People"
 "Piece of Sky"
 "Can't Shape Up"
 "Don't Let Me Down, Gently"
 "Cartoon Boyfriend"
 "Good Night Though"
 "Unfaithful"
 "Them, Big Oak Trees"
 "Room 410"

2000 Reissue bonus tracks 

 "It Was Me"
 "Gimme Some Truth" (John Lennon)
 "Get Together" (Chet Powers)
 "Inside You" (Veston Pance)

21st Anniversary Edition 
Re-recordings of the original album together with contemporary non-album tracks, 2010. 
 "30 Years in the Bathroom"
 "Radio Ass Kiss"
 "Them, Big Oak Trees"
 "Golden Green"
 "Cartoon Boyfriend"
 "Unfaithful"
 "Piece of Sky"
 "Let's Be Other People"
 "Don't Let Me Down, Gently"
 "Can't Shape Up"
 "Room 410"
 "Good Night Though"
 "Circlesquare"
 "Inside You" (Veston Pance)
 "Get Together" (Chet Powers)
 "It Was Me"
 "Our New Song"
 "Gimme Some Truth" (Lennon)

Personnel
The Wonder Stuff
Miles Hunt - vocals, guitar
Malcolm Treece - guitar, vocals
Rob "The Bass Thing" Jones - bass
Martin Bell - fiddle, banjo
James Taylor - Hammond organ
Martin Gilks - drums

References

External links
 Lyrics to the album
 Chords and lyrics to 'Unfaithful'
 Room 512's version of the Hup years.
 Discography
 Review on DooYoo.
 http://www.discogs.com/Wonder-Stuff-Hup-21st-Anniversary-Edition/release/2558285

The Wonder Stuff albums
1989 albums
Polydor Records albums